Bissendorf (formerly Bissendorpe) is a municipality in the district of Osnabrück, in Lower Saxony, Germany. It is situated approximately 9 km southeast of Osnabrück. Population 14,700 (2020).

It is divided into Bissendorf proper, Schledehausen and Wissingen.

References

 
Osnabrück (district)